First person or first-person may refer to:

 First person (ethnic), indigenous peoples, usually used in the plural
 First person, a grammatical person
 First person, a gender-neutral, marital-neutral term for titles such as first lady and first gentleman
 First-person view (radio control), a method of piloting a radio-controlled vehicle

Arts and entertainment
 First Person (1960 TV series), a Canadian drama series
 First Person (2000 TV series), an American series created by Errol Morris
 First-person (gaming), a graphical perspective used in video games
 First Person (radio program), an Australian biography program 2002–2012
 First-person narrative, a mode of storytelling
 First-person interpretation, in museum theatre, a dramatic presentation of museum materials
 "1st Person", a song by Stone Sour from Come What(ever) May

See also
 First man or woman (disambiguation)
 Second person (disambiguation)
 Third person (disambiguation)